Thomas Stirman (born August 22, 1879) was a Negro leagues outfielder and manager for several years before the founding of the first Negro National League.

He began playing semi-pro baseball in Kansas City, for the Jenkins Piano Company team, and the Bradbury Piano Company team before scoring a role with the Kansas City Giants by 1909.

He spent a few years playing with the Kansas City Royal Giants, and ended up playing for a Marion County, Ohio City League team in 1914. He was asked to manage one of those teams for the 1915 season.

References

External links
Baseball statistics and player information from Baseball-Reference Black Baseball Stats and Seamheads

Negro league baseball managers
1879 births
20th-century deaths
Year of death missing
20th-century African-American people
Kansas City Giants players
Kansas City Royal Giants players